The Guns may refer to:
The Guns (band), a band from South Wales
The Guns (film), a film directed by Ruy Guerra
The Guns EP, an EP by Minuit